The 2015 MLS Homegrown Game (also known as the 2015 Chipotle MLS Homegrown Game for sponsorship reasons) was the second version of the Major League Soccer Homegrown Game. The match took place between the best selected homegrown players from Major League Soccer at the Club América U-20 on July 28, a day before the 2015 MLS All-Star Game. The venue for the game was Dick's Sporting Goods Park in Commerce City, Colorado.

Landon Donovan served as coach of the MLS squad.

References

Homegrown Game
2015 in sports in Colorado
Soccer in Colorado
2015 Major League Soccer season
Sports competitions in Colorado
July 2015 sports events in the United States
Commerce City, Colorado